Madelyn Clare (November 18, 1894 – September 20, 1975; also known as Madelyn Klare or Madelyn Donovan) was an American actress during the early twentieth century. Born in Cleveland, Ohio, she was married to writer and director Thomas Dixon Jr. She died in Raleigh, North Carolina.

Filmography
 Mark of the Beast (1923)
 False Fronts (1922)
The Supreme Passion (1921)
 If Women Only Knew (1921)
The Discarded Woman (1920)
The Misleading Widow (1919)
The Hidden Truth (1919)
All Woman (1918)
Young America (1918)
 The Lincoln Cycle (1917)

References

External links

1894 births
1975 deaths
20th-century American actresses
Actresses from Cleveland